There are over 30 lakes named Mud Lake within the U.S. state of California.

See also
 List of lakes in California

References
 USGS-U.S. Board on Geographic Names

External links

Lists of coordinates
Lakes of El Dorado County, California
Lakes of Marin County, California
Lakes of Mono County, California
Lakes of Shasta County, California
Lakes of Siskiyou County, California
Lakes of Tuolumne County, California
Lakes of Alpine County, California
Lakes of Amador County, California
Lakes of Butte County, California
Lakes of Calaveras County, California
Lakes of Del Norte County, California
Lakes of Humboldt County, California
Lakes of Lassen County, California
Lakes of Mendocino County, California
Lakes of Modoc County, California
Lakes of Nevada County, California
Lakes of Placer County, California
Lakes of Plumas County, California
Lakes of San Luis Obispo County, California
Lakes of Santa Clara County, California
Lakes of Sierra County, California
Lakes of Trinity County, California
Lakes of California
Lakes of Northern California